George Dower (11 July 1913 – 8 September 1974) was  a former Australian rules footballer who played with Hawthorn in the Victorian Football League (VFL).

Notes

External links 
		
George Dower's profile at Australianfootball.com

1913 births
1974 deaths
Australian rules footballers from Victoria (Australia)
Hawthorn Football Club players